This is a list of Japanese anime episodes that adapt the Baki the Grappler manga series created by Keisuke Itagaki. A 45-minute original video animation (OVA) created by Knack Productions was released on August 21, 1994. Central Park Media released it in North America as Baki the Grappler: The Ultimate Fighter on December 1, 1996. Manga Entertainment later released it in Australia and the United Kingdom.

Group TAC created a 24-episode adaptation that aired on TV Tokyo from January 8, 2001 to June 25, 2001. They created a second 24-episode series, titled , that aired from July 23, 2001 to December 24, 2001. Funimation Entertainment licensed all 48 episodes in North America and released them on DVD between June 14, 2005 and February 27, 2007. Their English dub aired on the Funimation Channel beginning on June 19, 2006.


Series Overview

Episode list

Season 1: Kid Saga/Underground Arena Saga (2001)

Season 2: Maximum Tournament Saga (2001)

OVA

Home Media

References

Lists of anime episodes
Baki